Ribadelago is a village located in province of Zamora, Spain. It is in the Galende municipality.

It was partially destroyed in 1959 due to a dam failure in Vega de Tera reservoir, which caused 144 deaths.

References 

Municipalities of the Province of Zamora